Jolanta Polikevičiūtė (born 25 September 1970 in Panevėžys) is a retired female road racing cyclist from Lithuania, who competed in three Summer Olympics for her native country: 1996, 2004 and 2008. She is the twin sister of Rasa Polikevičiūtė, who also had a professional career in women's cycling.

References

1970 births
Living people
Sportspeople from Panevėžys
Lithuanian female cyclists
Identical twins
Cyclists at the 1996 Summer Olympics
Cyclists at the 2004 Summer Olympics
Cyclists at the 2008 Summer Olympics
Olympic cyclists of Lithuania
Lithuanian twins